Quadratino is an Italian comic strip series created by  Antonio Rubino.

Background 
Quadratino was published by the children magazine Il Corriere dei Piccoli from 1910 to 1911. An early version of the character had previously appeared in 1909, in the same magazine, in the story La tragica istoria del triangolo e del quadrato.

It depicts the surreal stories of the naughty Quadratino ("Little Square"), his grandmother Nonna Matematica ("Grandma Maths") and the tutor Trigonometria ("Trigonometry"); in every episode the titular character is punished for his bad behaviour with the transformation of his head in a rectangle, a triangle or in another geometric shape; at the end of the story, after he understood his faults, the head returns to normal.

References 

Italian comic strips
Italian comics characters
1910 comics debuts
1911 comics endings
Fictional Italian people
Humor comics
Text comics
Child characters in comics
Male characters in comics
Comics characters introduced in 1910
Comic strips started in the 1910s